The Ragamuffin War (Portuguese: Guerra dos Farrapos or Revolução Farroupilha) was a Republican uprising that began in southern Brazil, in the province (current state) of Rio Grande do Sul in 1835. The rebels were led by generals Bento Gonçalves da Silva and Antônio de Sousa Neto with the support of the Italian fighter Giuseppe Garibaldi. The war ended with an agreement between the two sides known as Green Poncho Treaty in 1845.

Over time, the revolution acquired a separatist character and influenced separatist movements throughout the entire country such as the Liberal Rebellions in São Paulo, Rio de Janeiro, and Minas Gerais in 1842, and the Sabinada in Bahia in 1837. 

It was inspired by the recently ended Cisplatine War, maintaining connections with both Uruguayan leaders as well as independent Argentine provinces such as Corrientes and Santa Fe. It even expanded to the Brazilian coast, in Laguna, with the proclamation of the Juliana Republic and to the Santa Catarina plateau of Lages.

The abolition of slavery was one of the demands of the Farrapos movement.

History

Beginning of the war
The uprising is believed to have begun due to the difference between the economy of Rio Grande do Sul and the rest of the country. Unlike the other provinces, the economy of Rio Grande do Sul focused on the internal market rather than exporting commodities. The province's main product,  (dried and salted beef), suffered badly from competition from  imported from Uruguay and Argentina. The people that benefited from these markets were called "Gaúchos", nomadic cowhands and farmers who lived in Rio Grande do Sul. The Gaúchos also lived in Argentina and Uruguay.

In 1835,  was nominated president of Rio Grande do Sul and at first, his appointment pleased the liberal farmers, but that soon changed. On his first day in the office, he accused many farmers of being separatists.

On 20 September 1835, general Bento Gonçalves captured the capital, Porto Alegre, beginning an uprising against the perceived unfair trade reinforced by the provincial government. The provincial president fled to the city of Rio Grande,  to the south. In Porto Alegre, the rebels, also known as "ragamuffins" after the fringed leather worn by the gaúchos, elected  their new president. Responding to the situation and further upsetting the rebels, the Brazilian regent, Diogo Antônio Feijó, appointed a new provincial president, who was forced to take office in exile in Rio Grande.

The Brazilian Army had a number of problems at the time and was not able to handle the secessionist threat. Through military reforms, the mass recruitment of civilians was made possible and they were able to quell the rebels in 1845.

Declaration of independence

Pushing to consolidate their power, Antônio de Souza Neto declared the independence of the Riograndense or Piratini Republic on 11 September 1836, with Bento Gonçalves as president nominee. However, Gonçalves was arrested and jailed by imperial forces until he escaped in 1837, returning to the province and bringing the revolution to a head. Nonetheless, Porto Alegre was recaptured by the empire and the rebels never managed to regain it.

Led by the Italian revolutionary Giuseppe Garibaldi, who joined the rebels in 1836, and Anita Garibaldi, the revolution spread north through Santa Catarina, which adjoined Rio Grande do Sul. One of the main cities of Santa Catarina, Laguna, was taken by the rebels but fell back into imperial hands after four months. It was in this struggle that Garibaldi gained his first military experience and got on the road leading to his becoming the famed military leader of the Unification of Italy. The rebel forces were also aided financially and indirect military support by the Uruguayan government led by José Fructuoso Rivera. The Uruguayans had the intention of creating a political union with the Riograndense Republic to create a new stronger state.

Resultant peace
The rebels refused an offer of amnesty in 1840. In 1842, they issued a Republican constitution as a last attempt to maintain power. The same year saw General Lima e Silva take command of Imperial forces in the area, and try to negotiate a settlement.

On 1 March 1845, the peace negotiations led by Lima e Silva and Antônio Vicente da Fontoura concluded with the signing of the Green Poncho Treaty (Portuguese: Tratado de Poncho Verde) between the two sides, in Dom Pedrito. The treaty offered the rebels a full amnesty, full incorporation into the imperial army and the choice of the next provincial president. All the debts of the Riograndense Republic were paid off by the Empire and a tariff of 25% was introduced on imported charque. The Riograndense and Juliana Republics remained in the Empire of Brazil and are now two states of the Federative Republic of Brazil, Rio Grande do Sul and Santa Catarina respectively.

As a goodwill gesture, the rebels chose Lima e Silva as the next provincial president.

Participants

Ragamuffins 
All of those who revolted against the imperial government were called Ragamuffins.

In 1832 the Ragamuffin Party was founded by Lieutenant Luís José dos Reis Alpoim, deported from Rio de Janeiro to Porto Alegre. The group used to meet at Major João Manuel de Lima e Silva's house. Lima e Silva's home also worked as the headquarters of Sociedade Continentino, the editor of the newspaper called , which strongly criticized the Empire. 

On 24 October 1833, the Ragamuffins promoted an uprising against the installation of the Military Society in Porto Alegre.

Southern Freemasonry, tending to republican ideals, had an essential role in the directions taken, and many of the Ragamuffin leaders were its adherents, among them, Bento Gonçalves da Silva, with the codename Sucre. Bento organized other Masonic lodges in the territory of Rio Grande do Sul, which he had been allowed to do since 1833.

Empire 
Their imperial troops were called, by the ragamuffins, caramurus or camels, a jocular term generally applied to members of the Restoration Party in the Imperial Parliament.

Minorities in the war

Indigenous 
In the years before the Ragamuffin War, the indigenous people were seen as a subdivision of the free population and performed the same jobs white and free men performed as livestock and war activities. The most famous village is called São Nicolau and is located in Rio Pardo, consisting of indigenous people from the eastern reductions.

Like the blacks, the indigenous people actively participated in the Ragamuffin War from the first to the last day. Although the indigenous presence in the conflict is scarce in the historiography of the Ragamuffin War, through the analysis of letters exchanged between the military, the strategic battle plans, and reports, it is possible to verify that the presence of this group was fundamental for the war.

Another historical evidence that indirectly points to the presence of Indians in the war is the population change in indigenous villages during the war period. In the village of Capela de Santa Maria, there was a sharp demographic drop during the war. The same happened with the village of São Nicolau, which also witnessed a demographic change with the predominance of older people and children in the village as men in adulthood went to war. The villages of São Vicente and Santa Isabel lasted less than three years due to the effects of the war.

However, the fact that the indigenous people participated in the war does not mean that they supported the cause, whether Ragamuffin or imperial, in its entirety. Several indigenous people were arrested after deserting their posts in the army or arguing with the leaders of the troops. Among the motivations for enlistment, the possibility of obtaining uniforms and weapons stands out; since, in cases of desertion, the indigenous people took the clothes and weapons they had received with them.

In Ragamuffin troops 
Although the indigenous people fought on both sides, their presence in the Ragamuffin troops is more documented than in the imperial forces.

Both in the campaign and the areas under the administration of the Ragamuffin rebels, there was difficulty in recruiting people to fight in the war, and one solution to increase the military contingent was to resort to the voluntary engagement of indigenous people. They performed different tasks, among which we can highlight the training of horses and fighting on the battlefield, and many did them without receiving any remuneration. 

Indigenous participation in the Ragamuffin troops was heterogeneous. As mentioned before, some indigenous individuals were arrested due to disobedience to the orders of their superiors, which indicates that they probably did not occupy a prestigious space within the military hierarchy. However, some indigenous people held high positions and even leadership positions, such as Roque Faustino, a captain in the Ragamuffin army and executed as a prisoner of war.

In historiography 
Despite the immense amount of bibliography on the Ragamuffin War, there is still a lack of works that report the presence of indigenous people in the conflict. These remain obscured to this day in the historiographical production of the Ragamuffin War, even though, in official documents, their presence, both on the imperial side and the farrago side has never been hidden.

A research done at the UFRGS Central Library collection found only eight books that mentioned the indigenous presence in the Ragamuffin War among more than 50 works.

Three other works (by Spalding (1963);  by Augusto Tasso Fragoso) comment on the indigenous presence in the troops of General Bento Manoel Ribeiro. Among these books, the one that has a more comprehensive commentary is Fragoso's, where, in his description of the victory of Bento Manoel's loyalist troops in the combat of Passo do Rosário, he emphasizes the existence of infantry composed of 80 Guaraní and, lists in a footnote, that in Bento Manoel's forces during the Fanfa battle, an infantry unit, and a lancer unit was coming from the missions and, therefore, presenting a high probability of being composed of Guaranís.

Blacks 
The blacks during the Ragamuffin War were fundamental and had an active participation throughout the entire conflict. It is estimated that, in all, they would represent approximately one-third to one-half of the republican army and later, they were integrated into the ragtag groups in the cavalry or infantry. The first was created on 12 September 1836 and the second on 31 August 1838 respectively. On 31 August 1838, 426 combatants joined the army.

They were recruited from among peasant slaves and tamers from Serra dos Tapes and Serra do Herval, located between the municipalities of Canguçu, Piratini, Caçapava, Encruzilhada and Arroio Grande, with the promise of liberation after the victory of the Ragamuffins. At first, they were commanded by Lieutenant Colonel Joaquim Pedro Soares, later they were led by Major Joaquim Teixeira Nunes.

Blacks played a prominent role in national confrontations, such as the capture of Porto Alegre in 1835 and of Pelotas in April 1836. The groups were composed of black and freed slaves, indigenous, mestizos and escaped slaves from other countries, mainly Uruguay. In addition to being soldiers and great defenders of the rags, the blacks also worked as drovers, messengers, campeiros and helped in the manufacture of gunpowder and in the cultivation of tobacco and yerba mate, appreciated by the group.

Legacy
The Brazilian Army reorganized itself to be a proper fighting force during the Ragamuffin War. The military would be able to defeat insurgencies that rose up during the Imperial Era of Brazil. However, this reformed military would prove disastrous against the Emperor when they rebelled to create a Republic.

In popular culture
 , a 2013 Brazilian film, follows the arrival of Giuseppe Garibaldi in Brazil, his meeting with Anita Garibaldi and his education in the art of guerilla warfare with Luigi Rossetti during the Ragamuffin War.
 Brazilian mini series 
, a series of novels written by Érico Verissimo, which became the drama, as well as the soap opera and the miniseries of the same name.
, Brazilian film by Anselmo Duarte
, Brazilian film of Durval Garcia

See also

 History of Rio Grande do Sul

 List of wars involving Brazil
 Revolutions of Brazil

References

External links

 A review of Farroupilha Week in modern RS state
 The Farroupilha War

Rebellions in Brazil
19th-century rebellions
Wars involving Brazil
Rebellions in South America
Separatist rebellion-based civil wars
Separatism in Brazil
1835 in Brazil
1845 in Brazil
1830s conflicts
1840s conflicts